Stephen Gaukroger, (born 9 July 1950) is a British/Australian historian of philosophy and science. He is Emeritus Professor of History of Philosophy and History of Science at the University of Sydney.

Life 
Stephen Gaukroger was born in Oldham, Lancashire, and educated at Cardinal Langley Grammar School. He studied Philosophy at Birkbeck College, University of London, where he was awarded first class honours with the official congratulations of the Board of Examiners. He was a graduate student at Darwin College, Cambridge, completing his PhD in 1977 in the Department of History and Philosophy of Science.

In 1977 he was elected to a research fellowship at Clare Hall, Cambridge, and at the end of 1978 moved to a research fellowship at the University of Melbourne. In 1981 he took up a lectureship in philosophy at the University of Sydney. He married Helen Irving in 1980. He divides his time between Sydney and London.

Honours 
Gaukroger was elected a Fellow of the Australian Academy of Humanities in 1992, a Fellow of the Royal Society of New South Wales in 2016, a Fellow of the Royal Historical Society in 2016, corresponding member of l’Académie Internationale d’Histoire des Sciences in 2007 and full member in 2016. In 2003 he was awarded the Australian Centenary Medal for contributions to history of philosophy and history of science.

Works
Books
 Explanatory Structures: Concepts of Explanation in Early Physics and Philosophy.  Brighton: Harvester Press, 1978. 
 Cartesian Logic: An Essay on Descartes’ Conception of Inference.  Oxford: Oxford University Press, 1989. 
 Arnauld: On True and False Ideas.  Manchester: Manchester University Press, 1990. 
 Descartes, An Intellectual Biography.  Oxford: Oxford University Press, 1995. 
 Descartes: The World and Other Writings.  Cambridge: Cambridge University Press, 1998. 
 Francis Bacon and the Transformation of Early-Modern Philosophy. Cambridge: Cambridge University Press, 2001. 
 Descartes’ System of Natural Philosophy. Cambridge: Cambridge University Press, 2002. 
 The Emergence of a Scientific Culture: Science and the Shaping of Modernity, 1210-1685. Oxford: Oxford University Press, 2006. 
 The Collapse of Mechanism and the Rise of Sensibility: Science and the Shaping of Modernity, 1680-1760.  Oxford: Oxford University Press, 2010. 
 Objectivity: A Very Short Introduction.  Oxford: Oxford University Press, 2012. 
 with Frédérique Aït-Touati. Le monde en images. Voir, représenter, savoir, de Descartes à Leibniz.  Paris: Classiques Garnier, 2015. 
 The Natural and the Human: Science and the Shaping of Modernity, 1739-1841, Oxford: Oxford University Press, 2016. 
 Civilization and the Culture of Science: Science and the Shaping of Modernity, 1795-1935, Oxford: Oxford University Press, 2020.
 The Failures of Philosophy: A Historical Essay, Princeton University Press, November 3, 2020.

Books edited
 Descartes: Philosophy, Mathematics and Physics. Brighton: Harvester Press, 1980. 
 The Uses of Antiquity: The Scientific Revolution and the Classical Tradition. Dordrecht & Boston: Kluwer, 1991. 
 The Soft Underbelly of Reason: The Passions in the Seventeenth-Century. London: Routledge, 1998. 
 with John Schuster and John Sutton. Descartes’ Natural Philosophy. London: Routledge, 2000. 
 with Conal Condren and Ian Hunter. The Philosopher in Early Modern Europe: The Nature of a Contested Identity. Cambridge: Cambridge University Press, 2006. 
 The Blackwell Guide to Descartes’ Meditations. Oxford: Blackwell, 2006. 
 with Catherine Wilson. Descartes and Cartesianism: Essays in Honour of Desmond Clarke. Oxford: Oxford University Press, 2017. 
 with Delphine Antoine-Mahut. Descartes’ Treatise on Man and its Reception. New York: Springer, 2017. 
 Knowledge in Modern Philosophy, London: Bloomsbury, 2018. 

Written introduction
 Charles Bonnet, Analytical Essay on the Faculties of the Soul. Oxford University Press, 2022.

References

External links

Official Page at the University of Sidney
 Stephen Gaukroger, "Natural Philosophy and a New World Picture", Berfrois'', 22 December 2010
 Rezension zu Stephen Gaukroger: Objektivität. Ein Problem und seine Karriere/https://www.socialnet.de/rezensionen/23588.php

1950 births
Living people
Alumni of Darwin College, Cambridge
British philosophers
British historians of philosophy
People from Oldham
Descartes scholars